Aminiha Hosseiniyeh is a historic hosseiniyeh in the Akhund (Molavi) neighbourhood of Qazvin, Iran. Built in 1858, it comprises 16 interconnected structures, constructed by the merchant Haj Mohammad Reza Amini. The public mourning area or Hosseinieh consists of three parallel halls running in an east to west direction with wooden sash windows that are interlinked with each other.

The southern halls boast of nine lattice worked sash windows with coloured panes. Its ceiling is adorned with paintings and mirror works. The center hall has rounded alcoves adorned with ornate mirror and plasterwork. This hall is connected to the northern and southern halls by two sets of five doors. On the semi-circular segment over the doors leading to the northern porch, fine emblems in connection with the twelve months of the year can be noted. The ceiling of this hall is adorned with plaster and mirror, in addition to paintings on wood.

The section under the halls comprises sectors such as the cellar, basement, store room, and kitchen which have access to the northern and southern courtyard. The north facing wall of the southern courtyard is of stone with innumerable embossments.

The buildings are open to visitors year round, between the hours of 9 am to 1 pm, and 5 pm to 8 pm.

References

Qazvin
Architecture in Iran
Religion in Iran
Buildings and structures completed in the 19th century
Buildings and structures in Qazvin Province
Tourist attractions in Qazvin Province